The Allegheny Intermediate Unit (AIU) is a branch of the Pennsylvania Department of Education, and is the largest of the 29 intermediate units in Pennsylvania. It was created by the state’s General Assembly in 1971, and is headquartered in Homestead.

The AIU provides specialized education services to 42 suburban public school districts and five career and technical centers in Allegheny County. The agency, which has about 1,200 employees at nearly 400 sites throughout the county, also operates 10 family centers and three schools for exceptional children. Funded by federal, state, county and private grants, the AIU coordinates more than 130 programs designed to help infants, young children, students and adults. In 2020, the programs offered by the AIU served more than 113,000 students in public schools.

Leadership and Governance 

The AIU's Board of Directors has 13 members, elected from Allegheny County's 42 suburban public school districts.  Dr. Robert Scherrer is the agency's executive director.

Public School Districts served
Allegheny Valley School District
Avonworth School District
Baldwin-Whitehall School District
Bethel Park School District
Brentwood Borough School District
Carlynton School District
Chartiers Valley School District
Clairton City School District
Cornell School District
Deer Lakes School District
Duquesne City School District
East Allegheny School District
Elizabeth Forward School District
Fox Chapel Area School District
Gateway School District
Hampton Township School District
Highlands School District
Keystone Oaks School District
McKeesport Area School District
Montour School District
Moon Area School District
Mt. Lebanon School District
North Allegheny School District
North Hills School District
Northgate School District
Penn Hills School District
Pine-Richland School District
Plum Borough School District
Quaker Valley School District
Riverview School District
Shaler Area School District
South Allegheny School District
South Fayette Township School District
South Park School District
Steel Valley School District
Sto-Rox School District
Upper St. Clair School District
West Allegheny School District
West Jefferson Hills School District
West Mifflin Area School District
Wilkinsburg School District
Woodland Hills School District

Career and Technology Centers Served
A.W. Beattie Career Center 
Forbes Road Career & Technology Center
McKeesport Career & Technology Center
Parkway West Career & Technology Center
Steel Center Career Technical School

The Role of Intermediate Units 
Pennsylvania’s intermediate units were created in 1971 in an effort to help school districts operate more efficiently and meet the specialized needs of their students.  Since then, these education agencies have evolved into an important resource on which school districts rely.

School districts and intermediate units are separate legal entities.  Intermediate units have no legal jurisdiction over school districts and do not control school districts.  On the contrary, intermediate units exist to serve school districts and provide leadership which will improve local operations.  Although intermediate units are an extension of the Pennsylvania Department of Education, they differ greatly from local school districts in several ways.

References

Intermediate Units in Pennsylvania
Educational administration
Education in Allegheny County, Pennsylvania